Woburn Sands is a town that straddles the border between Buckinghamshire and Bedfordshire in England, and also is part of the Milton Keynes urban area.The larger part of the town is in Woburn Sands civil parish, which is in the City of Milton Keynes,  Smaller parts of the town are in the neighbouring parishes of Aspley Guise and Aspley Heath (in Central Bedfordshire).  The meandering boundary between Buckinghamshire and Bedfordshire means the Lower and Middle Schools that serve all of the town are both in Aspley Guise CP. Bedfordshire Police and Thames Valley Police both deal with law enforcement issues in the town. At the 2011 Census, the population of the civil parish (only) was 2,916, that of the  built-up area (including much of Aspley Guise) was 5,959. Woburn Sands, Aspley Guise and Aspley Heath each has its own centre but together the three settlements are a contiguous built-up area.

History
The earliest evidence of settlement is an Iron Age hill fort dating from around 500 BC, called Danesborough Camp which is located to the southwest of the present town. Later when the settlement had developed into a hamlet, it was part of the parish of Wavendon, becoming a separate civil parish in 1907. Under the Local Government Act 1972 the parish council has adopted the status of a town in its own right. It has separated from Wavendon parish which is just to the north of the Marston Vale line.

The village name was originally Hogsty End, one of Wavendon's four 'ends' (along with Church End, Cross End and Lower End) but by Victorian times, this un-picturesque name had fallen out of favour, and Woburn Sands had taken over as the accepted name. The modern name is credited to a schoolmaster unable to attract business to his "Hogsty End Academy", and was one of the first to promote the use of the new name. The modern place name is related to nearby Woburn in Bedfordshire, and to the sandy local soil resulting from its proximity to the Greensand Ridge, an escarpment of Greensand that is part of the Woburn Sands Formation.

Transport

Rail
The town, alongside Wavendon and the surrounding areas of south-east Milton Keynes, is served by Woburn Sands railway station. The station is on the Marston Vale line, three closely placed stops east of Bletchley railway station, a junction station with the West Coast Main Line.

Road

Bus
The town is served by two bus services: South Beds Dial-a-Ride bus 47 to Tingrith and Leighton Buzzard, and Britannia bus 450 to Central Milton Keynes.

Governance
Woburn Sands CP has been part of the Borough (now City) of Milton Keynes since 1974, which has been a unitary authority since 1997. This gives Milton Keynes City Council the responsibility for the provision of most local government services. Voters registered in the parish are represented on MK City Council, which has (since 2014) been divided into 19 wards each carrying 3 councillors with Woburn Sands CP being part of the Danesborough and Walton ward.At the parish level, Woburn Sands CP has a town council which is based at Ellen Pettit Memorial Hall on the town's high street. 

The remainder of the town (within the CPs of Aspley Guise and Aspley Heath) has formed part of Central Bedfordshire (also a unitary authority) since 2009, and is part of the Aspley and Woburn ward for elections to Central Bedfordshire Council, which provides most local government services for this area.

References

External links
Woburn Sands Town Council
Woburn Sands local history site
The Hogsty End Handbook local community magazine
Cyclone Mountain Bike Club – MTB around local forest trails
Woburn Sands Folk Festival

Civil parishes in Buckinghamshire
Hill forts in Buckinghamshire
Areas of Milton Keynes
Towns in Buckinghamshire